Róbigzon Leandro Oyola Oyola (born 10 August 1988) is a Colombian cyclist, who currently rides for UCI Continental team .

Major results

2011
 6th Overall Tour do Rio
2012
 2nd Overall Vuelta a la Independencia Nacional
 7th Overall Tour do Rio
2013
 5th Time trial, National Road Championships
2014
 1st Stage 8 Vuelta a Guatemala
 1st Stage 1 (TTT) Vuelta a Colombia
 5th Road race, National Road Championships
2015
 1st  Overall Vuelta a la Independencia Nacional
 1st Stage 1 (TTT) Vuelta a Colombia
 4th Time trial, National Road Championships
2016
 1st  Team time trial, National Road Championships
2017
 7th Overall Tour of Ankara
2018
 6th Gran Premio Comité Olímpico Nacional
 7th Gran Premio FECOCI
2019
 6th Overall Vuelta del Uruguay
 6th Overall Tour of Qinghai Lake
1st Stage 1 (TTT)
2020
 Clásico RCN
1st Stages 1 (TTT) & 4
2022
 4th Overall Vuelta a Formosa Internacional
 10th Maryland Cycling Classic

References

External links
 
 
 

1988 births
Living people
Colombian male cyclists
People from Tolima Department